"The Japanese Sandman" is a song from 1920, composed by Richard A. Whiting and with lyrics by Raymond B. Egan. The song was first popularized in vaudeville by Nora Bayes, and then sold millions of copies as the B-side for Paul Whiteman's song "Whispering".

Content
The song is about a sandman from Japan, who exchanges yesterdays for tomorrows. By doing so he "takes every sorrow of the day that is through" and "he'll bring you tomorrow, just to start a life anew." The number has an Oriental atmosphere, and is similar to many other songs from the interwar period that sing about a dreamy, exotic setting.

Nora Bayes made a popular recording of the song in 1920. In the same year, the song was released as the B-side of Paul Whiteman's first record, "Whispering"; it spent 2 weeks in the no. 1 spot. It has been subsequently performed by several musical artists like Art Hickman, Benny Goodman, Bix Beiderbecke, Artie Shaw, Earl Hines, Paul Young, Django Reinhardt, the Andrews Sisters, Freddy Gardner,  and in 2010, a high-fidelity recording of Whiteman's historic arrangement, by Vince Giordano and his Nighthawks Orchestra.

Additionally, the song was recorded by the Nazi German propaganda band, Charlie and his Orchestra. For propaganda reasons, the lyrics were changed through references to the Japanese Empire.

In popular culture
The song was often used in American cartoons in the 1940s, such as 1942's The Ducktators, usually to mock Japanese characters, due to the attack upon the United States by the Imperial Japan.
An orchestral version is heard in the musical film Rose of Washington Square (1939), starring Alice Faye.
In the 1947 Disney cartoon "Cat Nap Pluto," both Pluto and Figaro are visited by figurative "sandman" likenesses of themselves in coolie hats, seeking to bring on sleep. These references are purely visual, however, as the Whiting song is not heard.
The Japanese boxer, Harold Hoshino, was nicknamed "The Japanese Sandman" in the 1930s.
In 1944 a version of the song plays out the submarine's speaker system to the crew in Destination Tokyo.
Hoagy Carmichael performed the song on ukulele in the 1952 film, Belles on Their Toes.
Whiteman's original can also be heard in the 1969 film, They Shoot Horses, Don't They? and on The Masked Marauders album from the same year.
The song appears in the 2009 fantasy film The Imaginarium of Doctor Parnassus.
Instrumental versions appeared in almost every one of the first five episodes of the HBO series Boardwalk Empire. A version with lyrics was featured in the show on October 24, 2010.
The Caretaker sampled the song for his tracks "The Weeping Dancefloor" in We'll All Go Riding on a Rainbow, and "Stage 4 Post Awareness Confusions J1" in Everywhere at the End of Time - Stage 4.

The Cellos version
In 1957, the U.S. doowop band The Cellos recorded "Rang Tang Ding Dong (I Am The Japanese Sandman)", which features the same character, but with different lyrics. Frank Zappa quoted from The Cellos' lyrics in his song "A Little Green Rosetta", from Joe's Garage (1979).

References

External links
 "The Japanese Sandman" at the Parlor Songs Academy

1920 songs
Fictional Japanese people
Songs about Japan
Songs about East Asian people
Songs about fictional male characters
Songs with music by Richard A. Whiting
Songs with lyrics by Raymond B. Egan
Works based on European myths and legends
Japan in non-Japanese culture
Sandman